Micheal Morake Rabanye (13 March 1944 – 10 October 2010), known professionally as Rex Rabanye, was a South African jazz, fusion and soulful pop musician.

Great instrumental legend Rex Rabanye, a key influence on Black Moses of the Soul Brothers and a generation of imitators.

Early  life
He was born in Potchefstroom.
Rex as he was affectionately known, studied B Uris at the University of Bophuthatswana now known as  North-West University, The university is based in Mahikeng where Rex lived with his family for some time.

Music career

To the south west of Johannesburg, Ikageng in Potchefstroom produced a hot soul band called the Teenage Lovers.It is hot property was Rex Rabanye, the keyboard wizard who was Ikageng's response to Alexandra's Sankie Chounyane.He had learned to play the keyboards from his father, Samuel Rabanye at the age of fifteen. His bee-hive organ sound earned him millions of fans around the country.

After going solo, Rex Rabanye hit the country with dynamites like O Nketsang and Moya Moya. Some of the multi-talented Rex's painting can be seen on the walls of the African Methodist Church in Ikageng. By the late 80s the lawman who hold a B.Uris degree had moved from his place of birth to Mmabatho near Mafikeng, from where he relaunched his musical career. His other albums include Somlandela, Campus Mood and Stop Nonsons.

It is just so sad that such a gifted individual could be failed by his health to a point of losing his hearing. I was almost moved to tears the evening SAMA 12 honoured him with a Lifetime Achievement award.

There he was on a wheelchair receiving the award he so much deserved after inspiring a whole generation of keyboardists. That reminded me of the night Curtis Mayfield was honoured in the same manner at the Grammy Awards. Touching moments! I stood up in front of my television set and applauded. 'Long live soulman! Go soulman go!' I screamed. Luckily I was alone in the house and did not have to explain myself to anyone..." (Mojapelo, 2008: 47-48)

 
He was a founding member of the Teenage Lovers band of which they formed in the late 1960s. The band consisted of Rex Rabanye (Keyboardist), Dan Makaku (Guitarist), Toto Rabanye (Bass Guitarist), Boy (Saxophonist) and Victor Masigo (Drummer).Lawrence 'Sackey' Goreoang(the "I Love Ikageng" and "Hey-Tah -Dah" hit maker) was also a guitarist in the band and later resorted to a rivalry band (The Question Marks) of The Teenage Lovers which he founded. The Teenage Lovers band made platinum hits like "Botany 500", "Trinity", "Mmabatho", "Potchefstroom Road" among others. When the Teenage Lovers disbanded Rex went solo, he conceived platinum-selling albums like Onketsang (1986) and Moya moya (1987).
To date Onketsang remains one of the favourite songs during African Weddings throughout South Africa and neighbouring countries, which is a legacy that is bound to last for many generations to come.

Personal life
Rex was married to Achu Rabanye and they  had  1 son, 2 daughters.

Death
He died on 10 October 2010 at his home in Potchefstroom after battling a lifelong illness.

Awards  and Nominations
Rex has received many awards in recognition for his contribution to the music industry, one being the South African Music Awards lifetime achievement award during the 2006 MTN SAMA's.

Discography

studio albums
 Moya-Moya (1986)
 O Nketsang (1986)
 Stôp Nônsôns (1986) 
 Moya-Moya (1986)
 Somlandela (1987)
 Campus Mood  (1988)
 There's Nothing For Mahala (2007)

References

External links
 
 http://afrosynth.blogspot.co.za/2010/09/rex-rabanye-campus-mood-1988-ccpblack.html

1944 births
2010 deaths
North-West University alumni
South African musicians
People from Potchefstroom
Deaths in South Africa